Jim Kremer (18 January 1918 – 24 July 2000) was a Luxembourgian footballer. He competed in the men's tournament at the 1948 Summer Olympics.

References

External links
 

1918 births
2000 deaths
Luxembourgian footballers
Luxembourg international footballers
Olympic footballers of Luxembourg
Footballers at the 1948 Summer Olympics
Sportspeople from Esch-sur-Alzette
Association football midfielders
CA Spora Luxembourg players
Luxembourgian football managers